General Agha Muhammad Yahya Khan   (4 February 1917 – 10 August 1980), commonly known as Yahya Khan, was a Pakistani military general who served as the third President of Pakistan and Chief Martial Law Administrator following his predecessor Ayub Khan's resignation from 25 March 1969 until his resignation on 20 December 1971. During his dictatorship, he ordered Operation Searchlight in an effort to suppress Bengali nationalism which triggered the Bangladesh Liberation War. He was central to the perpetration of the Bangladesh genocide, the genocide of the populace of modern-day Bangladesh which resulted in death of 300,000–3,000,000 Bengalis.

Born in Chakwal, Khan was educated from the Colonel Brown Cambridge School in Dehradun and the University of the Punjab in Lahore. He joined the Indian Military Academy and was commissioned to the British Indian Army in 1939. Khan served in the Second World War in the Mediterranean theatre against the Axis powers and rose to major military positions in the British infantry division. Following the creation of Pakistan in 1947, he was promoted to several ranks of the Pakistan Army. During the Second Kashmir War, Khan helped in executing the covert infiltration in Indian-administered Kashmir in 1965.  After being controversially appointed to assume the army command in 1966, Khan succeeded the presidency from Ayub Khan, who was forced to resign by protests.

As the third president of Pakistan, Yahya Khan enforced martial law by suspending the constitution in 1969. Holding the country's first nationwide elections in 1970, he delayed the power transition to the victorious Sheikh Mujibur Rahman from East Pakistan, which led to the Bangladesh Liberation War in March 1971. Khan subsequently ordered Operation Searchlight in an effort to suppress Bengali nationalism. He was central to the perpetration of the 1971 Bangladesh genocide. In December 1971, the Pakistani Army carried out preemptive strikes against the Bengali-allied Indian Army, culminating the start of the Indo-Pakistani War of 1971. The two wars resulted in  the surrender of the Pakistani army, and East Pakistan seceded as Bangladesh. Following these events, Khan resigned from the military command in the same month and turned over the presidential leadership to Zulfikar Ali Bhutto. Khan remained under house surveillance prior to 1979 when he was released by Fazle Haq. Khan died the following year in Rawalpindi and was buried in Peshawar.

Khan's two-year short regime is regarded as the leading cause of the breakup of Pakistan. He is viewed negatively in both Bangladesh, being considered the chief-architect of the genocide, and in Pakistan.

Early life
Agha Muhammad Yahya Khan was born in Chakwal, Punjab, British Indian Empire, on 4 February 1917, according to the references written by Russian sources. He and his family were of Karlani Pashtun origin.

According to Indian writer Dewan Berindranath's book Private Life of Yahya Khan (published in 1974), Yahya's father worked in the Indian Imperial Police, in Punjab province. He joined as a head constable and retired as a deputy superintendent. Yahya's father was posted in Chakwal, Punjab, British India, when Yahya Khan was born.  Yahya studied in the prestigious Col. Brown Cambridge School Dehradun and later enrolled at the University of Punjab from where he graduated with a B.A. degree.

Military career

Career before Pakistan's independence
Yahya Khan was commissioned into the British Indian Army from Indian Military Academy, Dehradun in 1939. An infantry officer from the 4th/10th Baluch Regiment (4th Battalion of 10th Baluch Regiment, later amalgamated with the modern and current form of Baloch Regiment, 'Baloch' was spelled as 'Baluch' in Yahya's time), Yahya saw action during World War II in North Africa where he was captured by the Axis Forces in June 1942 and interned in a prisoner of war camp in Italy from where he escaped in the third attempt.

Yahya Khan served in World War II as a lieutenant and later captain in the 4th Infantry Division (India). He served in Iraq, Italy, and North Africa. He was a POW in Italy before returning to India.

After the birth of Pakistan

After the partition of India, he decided to join the Pakistan Army in 1947, he had already reached to the rank of Major (acting Lieutenant-colonel). In this year he was instrumental in not letting the Indian officers shift books from the famous library of the Pakistan Army Staff College (now Command and Staff College) at Quetta, where Yahya was posted as an instructor at the time of the partition of India. He renamed the 'Command and Staff College' from 'Army Staff College'. At the age of 34, he was promoted to Brigadier and is still considered the youngest one-star officer in the history of Pakistan Armed Forces. He was appointed as commander of the 105 Independent Brigade that was deployed in LoC ceasefire region in Jammu and Kashmir in 1951–1952. He was described as a "hard drinking soldier" who liked young women's company and wine, though he was a meritorious and professional soldier.

Later Yahya Khan, as Vice Chief of General Staff, was selected to head the army's planning board set up by Ayub Khan to modernize the Pakistan Army in 1954–57. Yahya also performed the duties of Chief of General Staff from 1958 to 1962 from where he went on to command two infantry divisions from 1962 to 1965. He played a pivotal role in sustaining the support for President Ayub Khan's campaign in the 1965 presidential elections against Fatima Jinnah. He was made GOC of 7th Infantry Division of Pakistan Army, which he commanded during the 1965 war with India. At this assignment, he was not instrumental in planning and executing the military infiltration operation, the Grand Slam, which failed miserably due to General Yahya's delay owing to change of command decision, the Indian Army crossed the India–Pakistan border and made a beeline for Lahore.

The C-in-C
After the '65 war, Maj. Gen. Yahya Khan was appointed in the GHQ, Pakistan as the  chief of staff of the army. He was appointed as the commander-in-chief of Pakistan Army in September 1966 after getting promoted to lieutenant general and took command in 18th day of the month when President Ayub promoted him to full general. At promotion, Yahya Khan superseded two of his seniors: Lieutenant-General Altaf Qadir and Lieutenant-General Bakhtiar Rana.

After becoming the commander-in-chief of the army, Yahya energetically started reorganizing the Pakistan Army in 1966. The post-1965 situation saw major organisational as well as technical changes in the Pakistan Army. Until 1965, it was thought that army divisions could function effectively while getting orders directly from the army's GHQ. This idea failed miserably in the 1965 war and the need to have intermediate corps headquarters in between the GHQ and the fighting combat divisions was recognised as a foremost operational necessity after the 1965 war. In 1965 war, the Pakistan Army had only one corps headquarters (the 1 Corps).

Soon after the war had started the United States had imposed an embargo on military aid to both India and Pakistan. This embargo did not affect the Indian Army but produced major changes in the Pakistan Army's technical composition. US Secretary of State Dean Rusk well summed it up when he said, "Well if you are going to fight, go ahead and fight, but we’re not going to pay for it".

Pakistan now turned to China for military aid and the Chinese tank T-59 started replacing the US M-47/48 tanks as the Pakistan Army's MBT (Main Battle Tank) from 1966. 80 tanks, the first batch of T-59s, a low-grade version of the Russian T-54/55 series were delivered to Pakistan in 1965–66. The first batch was displayed in the Joint Services Day Parade on 23 March 1966. The 1965 War had proved that Pakistan Army's tank-infantry ratio was lopsided and more infantry was required. Three more infantry divisions (9, 16 and 17 Divisions) largely equipped with Chinese equipment and popularly referred to by the rank and file as "The China Divisions" were raised by the beginning of 1968. Two more corps headquarters: the 2 Corps Headquarters (Jhelum-Ravi Corridor) and the 4 Corps Headquarters (Ravi-Sutlej Corridor) were raised, also in East Pakistan a corps-sized formation (which was titled as the Eastern Command) was created.

President of Pakistan

Ayub Khan was President of Pakistan in the all part of the 1960s, but in the last part of the decade, popular resentment had boiled over against him. Pakistan had fallen into a state of disarray, and the long civil unrest in East Pakistan had evolved into a mass uprising in January of the year of 1969. After Ayub Khan had unsuccessful talks with the opposition, he handed over power to Yahya Khan in March 1969, who immediately imposed martial law.  When Yahya Khan assumed the office on 25 March 1969, he inherited a two-decade constitutional problem of inter-provincial ethnic rivalry between the Punjabi-Pashtun-Mohajir dominated West Pakistan and the ethnically-Bengali Muslim East Pakistan. In addition, Yahya also inherited an 11-year problem of transforming a country essentially ruled by one man to a democratic country, which was the ideological basis of the anti-Ayub movement of 1968–69. As an army chief, Yahya had all the capabilities, qualifications and potential, but he inherited an extremely-complex problem and was forced to perform the multiple roles of caretaker head of the country, drafter of a provisional constitution, resolving the One Unit question, satisfying the frustrations and the sense of exploitation and discrimination successively created in the East Wing by a series of government policies since 1948.

The American political scientist Lawrence Ziring observed :

Yahya Khan attempted to solve Pakistan's constitutional and inter-provincial/regional rivalry problems once he took over power from Ayub Khan in March 1969. The tragedy of the whole affair was the fact that all of the actions that Yahya took were correct in principle but too late and served only to further intensify the political polarization between the East and West wings:
 He dissolved the One Unit and restored the pre-1955 provinces of West Pakistan.
 He promised free fair direct one-man one-vote, elections on adult franchise, a basic human right that had been denied to the Pakistani people since the pre-independence 1946 elections by political inefficiency, double games and intrigue, by civilian governments from 1947 to 1958 and by Ayub's one-man rule from 1958 to 1969.

However, the dissolution of One Unit did not lead to the positive results that it might have occurred earlier. Yahya also made an attempt to accommodate the East Pakistanis by abolishing the principle of parity in the hope that a greater share in the assembly would redress their wounded ethnic regional pride and ensure the integrity of Pakistan. Instead of satisfying the Bengalis, it intensified their separatism since they felt that the west wing had politically suppressed them since 1958, which caused the rise of anti-West Wing sentiment in the East Wing.

In 1968, the political pressure exerted by Zulfikar Ali Bhutto had weakened President Ayub Khan, who had sacked Bhutto for disagreeing with Ayub's decision to implement on Tashkent Agreement, facilitated by the Soviet Union to end the hostilities with India. To ease the situation, Ayub had tried reaching out to terms with the major parties, the Pakistan Peoples Party (PPP) and the Awami League (AL), but remained unsuccessful. In poor health, President Ayub abrogated his own constitution and suddenly resigned from the presidency.

On 24 March 1969, President Ayub directed a letter to General Yahya Khan, inviting him to deal with the situation, as it was "beyond the capacity of (civil) government to deal with the... Complex situation." On 26 March 1969, General Yahya appeared in national television and announced to enforce martial law in all over the country. The 1962 constitution was abrogated, the parliament was dissolved, and Ayub's civilian officials were dismissed. In his first nationwide address, Yahya maintained, "I will not tolerate disorder. Let everyone remain at his post."

With immediate effect, he installed a military government and featured active duty military officials:

National Security Council and Legal Frame Order
Yahya was well aware of this explosive situation and decided to bring changes all over the country. His earlier initiatives directed towards establishing the National Security Council (NSC), with Major-General Ghulam Omar being its first advisor. It was formed to analyse and prepare assessments towards issues relating the political and national security.

In 1969, President Yahya also promulgated the Legal Framework Order No. 1970, which disestablished the One Unit programme, which had formed West Pakistan. Instead, it removed the prefix West but instead added Pakistan. The decree has no effect on East Pakistan. Then, Yahya announced general elections to be held in 1970 and appointed Judge Abdus Sattar as Chief Election Commissioner of the Election Commission of Pakistan. The changes were carried out by President Yahya Khan to return the country towards parliamentary democracy.

Last days of East Pakistan

1970 general elections

By 28 July 1969, President Yahya Khan had set a framework for elections that were to be held in December 1970. Finally, the general elections were held all over the country. In East Pakistan, the Awami League, led by Sheikh Mujibur Rahman, held almost all seats but no seat in any of four provinces of West Pakistan. The socialist Pakistan Peoples Party (PPP) had won the exclusive mandate in the four provinces of Pakistan but none in East Pakistan. The Pakistan Muslim League (PML), led by Nurul Amin, was the only party to have representation from all over the country, but it had failed to gain the mandate to run the government. The Awami League had 160 seats, all won from East Pakistan, the socialist PPP 81, and the conservative PML 10 in the National Assembly. The general elections's results truly reflected the ugly political reality: the division of the Pakistani electorate along regional lines and political polarisation of the country between East Pakistan and West Pakistan.

In political terms, therefore, Pakistan as a nation stood divided as a result. A series of bilateral talks between PPP and Mujibur Rahman produced no results and were unable to come to an agreement of transfer of power from West Pakistan to East Pakistan's representatives on the basis of the six-point programme. In Pakistan, the people had felt that the six-point programme was a step towards the secession from Pakistan.

Massacres in East Pakistan

While the political deadlock remained between the Awami League, PPP and the military government after the general elections in 1970, Yahya Khan began coordinating several meetings with his military strategists over the issue in East Pakistan. On 25 March 1971, Yahya initiated Operation Searchlight, a genocidal crackdown to suppress Bengali dissent. The situation in East Pakistan worsened, and the gulf between the two wings had become too wide to be bridged. As a result of Operation Searchlight, agitation was now transformed into civil war as Bengali members of Pakistan armed forces and Police mutinied and formed the Mukti Bahini along with common people of all classes to launch unconventional and hit-and-run operations. Violent disorder and chaos followed after the Pakistan Army continued its systematic and deliberate campaign of killing and mass rape of the populace of East Pakistan.

Both Yahya Khan and Bhutto flew to Dhaka and tried negotiations one more time, but they did not succeed and reached a deadlock.

Operation Searchlight was a genocidal military operation carried out by the Pakistan Armed Forces to curb the Bengali nationalist movement in erstwhile East Pakistan in March 1971. Ordered by the government in Pakistan, it was seen as the sequel to Operation Blitz, which had been launched in November 1970. The Pakistani government's view was that it had to launch a campaign to neutralise a rebellion in East Pakistan to save the unity of Pakistan. Sheikh Mujibur Rahman proclaimed the independent state of Bangladesh and a government-in-exile.

The original plan envisioned taking control of the major cities on 26 March 1971 and then eliminating all opposition, political or military within one month. The prolonged Bengali resistance had not been anticipated by Pakistani planners. The main phase of Operation Searchlight ended with the fall of the last major town in Bengali hands in mid-May.

The total number of people killed in East Pakistan is not known with any degree of accuracy. Bangladeshi authorities claim that 3 million people were killed, while the Hamoodur Rahman Commission, an official Pakistani Government investigation, put the figure as low as 26,000 civilian casualties. In her widely discredited book Dead Reckoning: Memories of the 1971 Bangladesh War, Sarmila Bose said between 50,000 and 100,000 combatants and civilians were killed by both sides during the war. A 2008 British Medical Journal study by Ziad Obermeyer, Christopher J. L. Murray, and Emmanuela Gakidou estimated that up to 269,000 civilians died as a result of the conflict; the authors note that this is far higher than a previous estimate of 58,000 from Uppsala University and the Peace Research Institute, Oslo.

General Yahya Khan arrested Sheikh Mujibur Rahman on charges of sedition and appointed Brigadier Rahimuddin Khan (later General) to preside over a special tribunal dealing with Mujib's case. Rahimuddin awarded Mujib the death sentence, and President Yahya put the verdict into abeyance. Yahya's crackdown, however, had led to the Bangladesh Liberation War within Pakistan, with India being drawn into the war, India fighting on behalf of the Bangladeshis against Pakistan, a war which would later extend into the Indo-Pak war of 1971.

The aftermaths of this war were mainly that East Pakistan became independent as Bangladesh and India captured approximately 15,000+ square kilometres (5,000+ square miles) of land of West Pakistan (now Pakistan). However, the captured territory of West Pakistan was given back to Pakistan in the Simla Agreement signed later on 2 July 1972 between Indira Gandhi and Zulfiqar Ali Bhutto.

The 1971 war led to increased tensions between the countries but nonetheless Pakistan recognised the independence of Bangladesh after severe pressure from the OIC. But this event led to high tensions between Pakistan and India.

US role

The United States had been a major sponsor of President Yahya's military government. American journalist Gary Bass notes in The Blood Telegram: Nixon, Kissinger, and a Forgotten Genocide, "President Nixon liked very few people, but he did like General Yahya Khan." Personal initiatives of President Yahya had helped to establish the communication channel between the United States and China, which would be used to set up the Nixon's trip in 1972.

Since 1960, Pakistan was perceived in the United States as an integral bulwark against global Communism in the Cold War. The United States cautiously supported Pakistan during 1971 although Congress kept in place an arms embargo. In 1970, India with a heavily socialist economy entered in a formal alliance with the Soviet Union in August 1971.

Nixon urged President Yahya Khan multiple times to exercise restraint. His objective was to prevent a war and safeguard Pakistan's interests, though he feared an Indian invasion of Pakistan that would lead to Indian domination of the subcontinent and strengthen the position of the Soviet Union. Similarly, President Yahya feared that an independent Bangladesh could lead to the disintegration of Pakistan. Indian military support for Bengali guerrillas led to war between India and Pakistan.

In November 1971, Indian Prime Minister Indira Gandhi met Nixon in Washington. She assured him that she didn’t want war with Pakistan, but he did not believe her. Witness accounts presented by Kissinger pointed out that Nixon made specific proposals to Prime Minister Gandhi on a solution for the crisis, some of which she heard for the first time, including a mutual withdrawal of troops from the Indo-East Pakistan borders. Nixon also expressed a wish to fix a time limit with Yahya for political accommodation in East Pakistan. Nixon asserted that India could count on US endeavors to ease the crisis within a short time. But, both Kissinger and Gandhi's aide Jayakar maintained, Gandhi did not respond to these proposals. Kissinger noted that she "listened to what was, in fact, one of Nixon's better presentations with aloof indifference" but "took up none of the points." Jayakar pointed out that Gandhi listened to Nixon "without a single comment, creating an impregnable space so that no real contact was possible." She also refrained from assuring that India would follow Pakistan's suit if it withdrew from India's borders. As a result, the main agenda was "dropped altogether."

On 3 December 1971, Yahya preemptively attacked the Indian Air Force and Gandhi retaliated, pushing into East Pakistan. Nixon issued a statement blaming Pakistan for starting the conflict and blaming India for escalating it. He favored a cease-fire. The United States was secretly encouraging the shipment of military equipment from Iran, Turkey, and Jordan to Pakistan, offering to later replenish those countries' weapons stocks despite Congressional objections. The US used the threat of an aid cut-off to force Pakistan to back down, while its continued military aid to Islamabad prevented India from launching incursions deeper into the country. Pakistan forces in East Pakistan surrendered on 16 December 1971, leading to the creation of the independent state of Bangladesh.

Fall from power
When the news of the surrender of Pakistan reached through the national television, the spontaneous and overwhelming public anger over Pakistan's defeat by Bangladeshi rebels and the Indian Army, followed by the division of Pakistan into two parts boiled into street demonstrations throughout Pakistan. Rumors of an impending coup d'état by junior military officers against President Yahya Khan swept the country. Yahya became the highest-ranking casualty of the war: to forestall further unrest, on 20 December 1971 he handed over the presidency and government to Zulfikar Ali Bhutto— the ambitious leader of Pakistan's powerful and popular (at that time) People's Party.

Within hours of Yahya stepping down, President Bhutto reversed Judge Advocate General Branch (Pakistan)'s verdict against Sheikh Mujibur Rahman and instead released him to see him off to London. President Bhutto also signed orders for Yahya's house confinement, the man who imprisoned Mujib in the first place. Both actions produced headlines around the world.

Personal life
Yahya is said to have had a relationship with Akleem Akhtar but he was never married. He was born into a Shia Muslim family, but was non-practising and was known to have indulged in activities prohibited in Islam such as fornication with prostitutes and the consumption of alcohol. He also had a brief relationship with Bengali woman called Mrs Shamim, also known as Black Pearl.

Yahya had a son, named Ali Yahya Khan.

Death
Yahya remained under house arrest until 1979, when he was released from custody by martial law administrator General Fazle Haq. He stayed out from public events and died on 10 August 1980 in Rawalpindi, Punjab, Pakistan.

Legacy 
After being released from these restrictions in 1977, he died in Rawalpindi in 1980. He is viewed largely negatively by Pakistani historians and is considered among the least successful of the country's leaders. Yahya Khan was awarded ,  but then stripped of his service honours by Pakistan. Yahya Khan's rule is widely regarded as the leading cause of the breakup of Pakistan.

Notes

References

External links

 Official profile at Pakistan Army website 
 YAHYA KHAN AND BANGLADESH
 Chronicles Of Pakistan
 Henry Kissinger and PM China discussed Yahya Khan and 1971 loss

|-

|-

|-

|-

|-

1917 births
1980 deaths
Pashtun people
People from Peshawar
People from Chakwal District
University of the Punjab alumni
Indian Military Academy alumni
British Indian Army officers
Baloch Regiment officers
Indian Army personnel of World War II
Indian military personnel of World War II
Non-U.S. alumni of the Command and General Staff College
Pakistani generals
20th-century Pakistani people
Pakistani military leaders
Military personnel of the Indo-Pakistani War of 1965
Presidents of Pakistan
Commanders-in-Chief, Pakistan Army
Foreign Ministers of Pakistan
Defence Ministers of Pakistan
Generals of the Bangladesh Liberation War
Generals of the Indo-Pakistani War of 1971
Causes and prelude of the Bangladesh Liberation War
1971 controversies
Controversies in Pakistan
Pakistani anti-communists
Generals of the Indo-Pakistani War of 1965
1971 Bangladesh genocide perpetrators
People of the Cold War
Indian prisoners of war
World War II prisoners of war held by Italy
Pakistan Command and Staff College alumni